Battlefield is the first serial of the 26th season of the British science fiction television series Doctor Who, which was first broadcast in four weekly parts on BBC1 from 6 to 27 September 1989. It was the last to feature Nicholas Courtney as Brigadier Lethbridge-Stewart in Doctor Who.

In the serial, Morgaine (Jean Marsh), a sorceress from another dimension, summons the planet-devouring Destroyer (Marek Anton) in England, where she also seeks to take the sword Excalibur for herself. The plot is loosely based on Arthurian legend.

Part 1's 3.1 million viewers remain the lowest ratings of any full episode of Doctor Who.

Plot
In response to a distress signal, the Seventh Doctor and Ace materialise the TARDIS near Lake Vortigern in England. At the Gore Crow hotel, they meet a young woman called Shou Yuing and a knight, Ancelyn, who addresses the Doctor as "Merlin". The Doctor shows interest in a scabbard which hangs over the mantelpiece in the hotel. The party is surrounded by an ominous group of knights led by Mordred. When Mordred begins an arcane ritual, the scabbard flies across the room, stirred by the magic. Morgaine then arrives on the scene through a rift in space and time.

The next day, archaeologist Peter Warmsly shows the Doctor where he uncovered the scabbard. Under the lake, The Doctor and Ace find a ruined spaceship containing the body of King Arthur, lying next to a sword. When Ace removes the sword from its plinth, she activates a defence mechanism. The Doctor ejects Ace from the spaceship, sending her shooting up through the water and "becoming" the Lady of the Lake.

Mordred and Morgaine go to the hotel to retrieve Excalibur. Meanwhile, UNIT troops are staging an evacuation, led by Brigadier Lethbridge-Stewart. Just as Mordred and Ancelyn are about to fight, the Doctor intervenes. Mordred reveals that the battle was a ruse to lure the Doctor, and that Morgaine has summoned the Destroyer of Worlds.

The Doctor finds the hotel in ruins, but Ace and Shou Yuing safe. In the debris, the Doctor finds a portal to Morgaine's castle. On arrival, the Brigadier shoots the Destroyer, to no effect. Morgaine releases the Destroyer's bonds; she and Mordred take Excalibur back through the portal.

The Brigadier marches back into the castle, tells the Destroyer, "Get off my world!", and empties his revolver (this time loaded with silver bullets) into the monster's chest. It explodes.

Back at the convoy, The Doctor confronts Morgaine, telling her of Arthur's death. Mordred and Morgaine are then imprisoned.

Production

The story was repeated on BBC2 over four consecutive Fridays from 23 April – 14 May 1993, achieving viewing figures of 1.6, 1.2, 1.3, and 1.2 million respectively.

Pre-production
Working titles for this story included Storm Over Avallion. The early story outlines included the death of Lethbridge-Stewart.

In a deleted scene (included on the DVD release) the Doctor refers to one of Clarke's three laws — telling Ace that sufficiently advanced technology is indistinguishable from magic — to explain the various forms of magical attack used against them by the sorceress Morgaine, and also that Arthur's trans-dimensional spaceship was grown, not built. He adds that the reverse of Clarke's Law is also true.

Production
The first director approached to handle Battlefield was Graeme Harper, who had previously directed The Caves of Androzani and Revelation of the Daleks in 1984 and 1985 respectively. However, Harper was committed to the Central Independent Television drama series Boon, and unavailable to return to Doctor Who.

During recording of the sequence where Ace is trapped in the glass water tank, the glass cracked, causing Sophie Aldred to sustain minor cuts to her hands and creating a major safety hazard as water flooded out onto the studio floor, across which live wires were running. The moment when the tank first cracked can be seen in Part Three as the Doctor struggles with the controls and Ace is lifted clear of the water. Sylvester McCoy shouted out to the stage hands above her to pull her quickly out before the tank exploded.

Cast notes
Nicholas Courtney returned explicitly as the Brigadier for the first time since The Five Doctors in 1983, Courtney's small cameo role in 1988's Silver Nemesis having been unidentified. Other guest stars making return appearances in Battlefield include Jean Marsh, who over twenty years earlier had played Princess Joanna in The Crusade and later, companion Sara Kingdom in The Daleks' Master Plan, which had been, coincidentally, Nicholas Courtney's first Doctor Who story; and June Bland, who appeared in the Fifth Doctor story Earthshock.

Angela Bruce later reprised the role of Brigadier Winifred Bambera in the audio play Animal.

Commercial releases

In print

Marc Platt's novelisation was published by Target Books in July 1991. Its prologue features the future Merlin Doctor taking the wounded King Arthur aboard the spaceship beneath the lake following the last battle as well as additional information about UNIT and Morgaine's dimension. The final scene implies that the Brigadier is planning to go with Ancelyn back to the other dimension to help restore order, a similar plot point to the ending of the Eighth Doctor Adventures novel The Shadows of Avalon. It was the last novelisation of a televised Doctor Who serial to be published in the traditional "short paperback" format Target had been using since 1973. After one more novelisation based upon the audio story The Pescatons, novelisations were published in paperback editions with greater page counts and a different format.

An audiobook of the Target novelisation was released by BBC Audio on 5th May 2022, read by Toby Longworth.

Home media
Battlefield was released on VHS in March 1998 with two minutes of additional footage. It was released on Region 2 DVD on 26 December 2008 as a Special Edition featuring the original televised story plus a movie-length version featuring extended scenes and new special effects, with its scenes reedited into script order to clarify the story's themes and sequence of events. This serial was also released as part of the Doctor Who DVD Files in issue 59 on 6 April 2011.

The serial was released on blu-ray on 27 January 2020 as part of "The Collection - Season 26" box set. It features, not only the original TV broadcast episodes of Battlefield, but also the extended VHS release episodes as well as a special feature-length extended edition.

References

External links

Target novelisation

On Target — Battlefield

Television series based on Arthurian legend
Seventh Doctor serials
1989 British television episodes
Doctor Who stories set on Earth
Novels by Marc Platt
UNIT serials
Television episodes set in England